Joseph Snively (born January 1, 1996) is an American professional ice hockey center for the  Washington Capitals of the National Hockey League (NHL). Snively signed with the Capitals as an undrafted free agent in 2019 after playing four years at Yale University.

Career

Professional
On March 18, 2019, Snively signed a two-year, entry-level contract with the Washington Capitals. He was re-signed by the Capitals to a one-year, two-way contract for $750,000 on June 3, 2021. After playing parts of four seasons with the Hershey Bears, Snively was recalled to the Capitals on December 19, 2021, and made his NHL debut that night against the Los Angeles Kings. On February 10, 2022, Snively scored two goals and an assist in a 5–2 victory over the Montreal Canadiens, earning his first two NHL goals.

Personal life
Growing up in Herndon, Virginia, Snively rooted for the Washington Capitals and was part of the team's Washington Little Caps program. His uncle is Canadian diver David Snively, who was a member of the Canadian Olympic team that boycotted the 1980 Summer Olympics.

Career statistics

International

Awards and honors

References

External links
 

1996 births
American ice hockey centers
Hershey Bears players
Ice hockey people from Virginia
Living people
Sioux City Musketeers players
Undrafted National Hockey League players
Washington Capitals players
Yale Bulldogs men's ice hockey players